Sara Renner (born April 10, 1976) is a Canadian cross-country skier who competed from 1994 to 2010. With Beckie Scott, she won the silver medal in the team sprint event at the 2006 Winter Olympics in Turin and earned her best individual finish of eight in the 10 km classical event in those same games. She was born in Golden, British Columbia.

2006 Winter Olympics

Norwegian coach Bjørnar Håkensmoen gave Sara Renner a ski pole after hers was broken when a competitor stepped on it during the cross-country team sprint at the 2006 Winter Olympics. Norway's athlete ended up fourth, implying that this selfless act of sportsmanship may well have cost the Norwegian team a medal. Renner gave Håkensmoen a bottle of wine as a thank you, while other Canadians responded with phone calls and letters to the Norwegian Embassy and sent 7,400 cans of maple syrup to Håkensmoen. The incident was immortalized in a 2010 Winter Olympics television commercial.

Retirement
She announced her retirement in Vancouver following her finish in the Women's 30 km, Mass Start event. She said: "I just left everything out there today," Renner said after carrying her three-year-old daughter, Aria, in her arms through a series of TV interviews. "It was a beautiful race in the pouring rain — quite the way to go out. To hear everyone cheering for me, it was absolutely inspiring."

Cross-country skiing results
All results are sourced from the International Ski Federation (FIS).

Olympic Games
 1 medal – (1 silver)

World Championships
 1 medal – (1 bronze)

a.  Cancelled due to extremely cold weather.

World Cup

Season standings

Individual podiums
 4 podiums – (4 )

Team podiums

 2 podiums – (1 , 1 )

Personal life
Renner grew up at remote Mount Assiniboine Lodge, the oldest backcountry ski lodge in the Canadian Rockies, located southwest of Banff and Canmore, Alberta, just across the British Columbia provincial border. Her parents ran the high-altitude lodge for three decades, and she credits her youth there for her skiing success.

In 2001 Renner posed nude in a calendar called "Nordic Nudes" to help raise money for the Canadian women's Nordic ski team. Teammates Beckie Scott, Milaine Thériault, Jaime Fortier and sister Amanda Fortier also posed nude for the calendar.

Renner is married to retired Italian-Canadian alpine skier Thomas Grandi. Grandi had family support out for himself and his wife during the Turin Olympics.

On September 18, 2006, Renner announced that she was taking the year off to have a baby with husband Thomas Grandi. Renner came back after her baby was born, and lead the women's team to Vancouver 2010.

On February 2, 2007, Renner gave birth to a girl named Aria at a hospital in Banff, Alberta. She and Grandi live in Canmore, Alberta.

Notes

References
 
 Biography
 Cross Country Canada – Canada's Cross Country Ski Program
 CBC Athlete Bio

1976 births
Canadian female cross-country skiers
Canadian people of German descent
Cross-country skiers at the 1998 Winter Olympics
Cross-country skiers at the 2002 Winter Olympics
Cross-country skiers at the 2006 Winter Olympics
Cross-country skiers at the 2010 Winter Olympics
Living people
Sportspeople from British Columbia
Olympic cross-country skiers of Canada
Olympic silver medalists for Canada
People from the Columbia-Shuswap Regional District
Olympic medalists in cross-country skiing
FIS Nordic World Ski Championships medalists in cross-country skiing
Medalists at the 2006 Winter Olympics
Sportspeople from Alberta